Callosa is a genus of East Asian dwarf spiders first described by Q. Y. Zhao & S. Q. Li in 2017.  it contains only two species.

References

Araneomorphae genera
Linyphiidae